Type in may refer to
Type-In, a meeting of typewriter enthusiasts
Type-in program
Type-in traffic